"One Piece at a Time" is a country novelty song written by Wayne Kemp and recorded by Johnny Cash and the Tennessee Three in 1976. It was the last song performed by Cash to reach No. 1 on the Billboard Hot Country Singles chart and the last of Cash's songs to reach the Billboard Hot 100, on which it peaked at No. 29.

Content

The narrator leaves his home in Kentucky in 1949 to pursue work at General Motors in Detroit, Michigan, installing wheels on Cadillacs, watching each one roll by day after day on the assembly line, knowingly lamenting that he will never be able to afford one of his own.

Beginning almost immediately, the narrator and a co-worker decide to "steal" a Cadillac by way of using their assembly line jobs to obtain the parts via salami slicing. He takes the small parts home hidden in his unusually large lunch box; larger parts are smuggled out in his co-worker's motorhome.

The process of accumulating all the necessary parts turns out to take at least 25 years (the newest part mentioned, the engine, is from 1973), but once they have what they think is a complete car, they attempt to assemble the pieces. Because automakers inevitably make numerous changes to their models, designs and parts over the course of a quarter-century, the result was a hodgepodge of parts from different years and models that did not fit together well (for example, the bolt holes disappear when attempting to fit the 1973 engine with a 1953 transmission, and there was only one right headlight and two left headlights, and only one tail fin).

Despite these problems, the narrator and his co-worker get the car in proper working condition. The singer's wife is skeptical of the outcome, but wants a ride in it anyway. Townspeople begin laughing at the narrator’s unique car as he takes it to have it registered. However, the folks at the courthouse were not as pleased – it took the "whole staff" to complete the vehicle title, which ended up weighing 60 pounds (27 kg).

The song ends with a CB radio conversation between the narrator and a truck driver inquiring about the "psychobilly Cadillac", in which the singer replies, "you might say I went right up to the factory and picked it up; it's cheaper that way", then when asked what model it is describes it as model years 1949 up to 1970.

The song is in a moderate tempo in the key of F major, with a main chord pattern of F-B-C-F. The verses are done in a talking blues style; Cash had used a similar spoken-word format and chord progression in his earlier hit "A Boy Named Sue."

Legacy
The name of the rockabilly subgenre psychobilly came from a lyric in "One Piece at a Time".

Bruce Fitzpatrick, owner of Abernathy Auto Parts and Hilltop Auto Salvage in Nashville, Tennessee, was asked by the promoters of the song to build the vehicle for international promotion. Fitzpatrick had all the models of Cadillacs mentioned in the song when it was released and built a car using the song as a model. The result was presented to Cash in April 1976. It was parked outside the House of Cash in Hendersonville, Tennessee, until someone could find a place to store it. After The House of Cash Museum closed, Bruce Fitzpatrick retrieved the '49–'70 Cadillac with a wrecker and brought it back to Abernathy Auto Parts and Hilltop Auto Salvage in Nashville, Tennessee, and crushed it.

The song was covered by Chicago rock band Tub Ring for the 2001 Johnny Cash tribute album, Cash from Chaos.

The psychobilly Cadillac from the "One Piece at a Time" video is at the Storytellers museum in Bon Aqua, Tennessee. This is a different car from the one made by Bruce Fitzpatrick. This car was made at the behest of Bill Patch of Welch, Oklahoma, and constructed by Leland Mayfield, Harley Malone, Eldon McCoy and Don. P. Chenoweth.

An attempt at building a vehicle "one piece at a time" was completed successfully over a five-year period by a Chinese motorcycle assembly line worker in Chongqing.

Charts

Weekly charts

Year-end charts

References

External links
Origin of the Second Cadillac as presented by the Antique Automobile Club of America. See also 

1976 singles
Johnny Cash songs
Songs written by Wayne Kemp
Songs about cars
Songs about labor
Novelty songs
Columbia Records singles
1976 songs
Citizens band radio in popular culture
Cadillac